The Longest Day is a 1962 American epic war film, shot in black and white and based on Cornelius Ryan's 1959 non-fiction book of the same name about the D-Day landings at Normandy on June 6, 1944. Producer Darryl F. Zanuck paid Ryan $175,000 for the film rights to the book. The screenplay was by Ryan, with additional material written by Romain Gary, James Jones, David Pursall, and Jack Seddon. The film was directed by Ken Annakin (British and French exteriors), Andrew Marton (American exteriors), and Bernhard Wicki (German scenes).

The film features a large international ensemble cast that includes John Wayne, Kenneth More, Richard Todd, Robert Mitchum, Richard Burton, Steve Forrest, Sean Connery, Henry Fonda, Red Buttons, Peter Lawford, Eddie Albert, Jeffrey Hunter, Stuart Whitman, Tom Tryon, Rod Steiger, Leo Genn, Gert Fröbe, Irina Demick, Bourvil, Curd Jürgens, George Segal, Robert Wagner, Paul Anka, and Arletty. Many of these actors played roles that were essentially cameo appearances. Several cast members had seen action as servicemen during the war, including Albert, Fonda, Genn, More, Steiger, and Todd, who was among the first British officers to land in Normandy in Operation Overlord and participated in the assault on Pegasus Bridge.

The filmmakers employed several actual Allied and Axis D-Day participants as consultants, many of whom had their roles re-enacted in the film. These included Günther Blumentritt (a former German general), James M. Gavin (an American general), Frederick Morgan (Deputy Chief of Staff at SHAEF), John Howard (who led the airborne assault on the Pegasus Bridge), Lord Lovat (who commanded the 1st Special Service Brigade), Philippe Kieffer (who led his men in the assault on Ouistreham), Marie-Pierre Kœnig (who commanded the Free French Forces in the invasion), Max Pemsel (a German general), Werner Pluskat (the major who was the first German officer to see the invasion fleet), Josef "Pips" Priller (the hot-headed pilot), and Lucie Rommel (widow of Field Marshal Erwin Rommel).

The film won two Academy Awards and was nominated for three others.

Plot
Shot in a docudrama style (with captions identifying the different participants), the film opens in the days leading up to D-Day, depicting events on both sides of the English Channel. There is disagreement within the German High Command as to where the Allies will land and how the Wehrmacht should respond, but the threat is not perceived to be imminent, given the stormy weather. On June 5, 1944, not wanting to keep his forces waiting any longer, Gen. Dwight D. Eisenhower, Supreme Commander of SHAEF, makes the decision to go ahead with plans to invade France through Normandy the following day after receiving a somewhat hopeful weather report.

In the early hours of June 6, Allied airborne troops are sent in to take key locations, and the French Resistance reacts to the news that the invasion has started. British troops arrive in gliders to secure Pegasus Bridge, American paratroopers land scattered around Sainte-Mère-Église to defend a road that will be a vital artery for the invasion, and French Resistance and SOE agents conduct infiltration and sabotage work. There is uncertainty among German commanders about whether these events are a feint to distract from Allied crossings at the Strait of Dover (see Operation Fortitude), where the senior German staff had always assumed the invasion would begin.

As day breaks, Allied forces land on several beaches in Normandy and attempt to push inland, having particular trouble at Omaha Beach. Two lone Luftwaffe pilots strafe the beaches before flying away. The U.S. Provisional Ranger Group conducts an assault on the artillery at Pointe du Hoc, only to discover the guns are not functional. Free French Forces destroy a German stronghold in Ouistreham. After blowing through a concrete barrier, the American troops on Omaha Beach are able to begin their advance and join the rest of the Allied troops on the march to retake France and, eventually, conquer Germany.

Cast
Note: Characters listed in order of rank.

American

British

French

German

Production

Development
French producer Raoul Lévy signed a deal with Simon & Schuster to purchase the filming rights to Cornelius Ryan's book The Longest Day: June 6, 1944 D-Day on March 23, 1960. After finishing The Truth, Lévy set up a deal with the Associated British Picture Corporation and got director Michael Anderson attached. Ryan would receive $100,000, plus $35,000 to write the adaptation's screenplay. Lévy intended to start production in March 1961, filming at Elstree Studios and the English and French coasts, but the project stalled when ABPC could not get the $6 million budget Lévy expected. Eventually, former 20th Century Fox mogul Darryl F. Zanuck learned about the book while producing The Big Gamble, and in December purchased Lévy's option for $175,000. Zanuck's editor friend Elmo Williams wrote a film treatment, which piqued the producer's interest and made him attach Williams to The Longest Day as associate producer and coordinator of battle episodes. Ryan was brought in to write the script, but had conflicts with Zanuck as soon as the two met. Williams was forced to act as a mediator; he would deliver Ryan's script pages to Zanuck, then return them with the latter's annotations. While Ryan developed the script, Zanuck also brought in other writers for cleanups for the various nationalities, including James Jones for the Americans, Romain Gary for the French, Noël Coward for the British and Erich Maria Remarque for the Germans. As their contributions to the finished screenplay were relatively minor, Ryan managed to get the screenplay credit after an appeal to the Writers Guild arbitration, but four other writers are credited for writing "additional episodes" in the film's closing credits.

During pre-production, producer Frank McCarthy, who had worked for the United States Department of War during World War II, arranged for military collaboration with the governments of France, Germany, the United Kingdom, and the United States. Zanuck, who was friends with Supreme Allied Commander Lauris Norstad, secured 700 United States Army Europe and Africa soldiers for use as extras. However, hundreds of these soldiers had to be recalled after the Berlin Crisis of 1961, and many Members of Congress, such as Bob Wilson, criticized the military for transferring soldiers to a film production in France during a major Cold War standoff. The Senate Subcommittee on Constitutional Rights under Sam Ervin investigated the film for allegly forcing soldiers to appear as extras against their will. In the end, the film included 250 U.S. Army soldiers and 500 British Army soldiers as extras.

Zanuck realized that, with eight battle scenes, shooting would be accomplished more expediently if multiple directors and units worked simultaneously, so he hired German directors Gerd Oswald and Bernhard Wicki, British director Ken Annakin, and Hungarian-American director Andrew Marton. Zanuck's son Richard D. Zanuck was reluctant about the project, particularly the high budget; with a budget of $10 million ($ in  dollars), this was the most expensive black-and-white film made until 1993, when Schindler's List was released.

Casting

 Jack Lord was originally cast in a starring role in the film when Levy was producing it. 
 Charlton Heston actively sought the role of Lt. Col. Benjamin H. Vandervoort, but the last-minute decision of John Wayne to take the role prevented Heston's participation. At 55, Wayne was 28 years older than Vandervoort was on D-Day (and 10 years older than he was in 1962). All of the other major actors accepted $25,000 as payment for their appearance in the film, but Wayne insisted on $250,000 to punish Zanuck for once referring to him as "poor John Wayne", regarding Wayne's problems with his lavish film The Alamo (1960).
 Pop stars Paul Anka, Tommy Sands, and Fabian appear together as Rangers in the film.
 Mel Ferrer was originally signed to play the role of Gen. James M. Gavin, but was recast due to a scheduling conflict.
 Richard Todd played Maj. John Howard, leader of the British airborne assault on the Pegasus Bridge, and Todd himself took part in the real bridge assault on D-Day. He was offered the chance to play himself, but took the part of Maj. Howard instead.
 Bill Millin was the piper who accompanied Lord Lovat to Normandy with his bagpipes, and it is a common misconception that he played himself in the film, while he was actually portrayed by Pipe Major Leslie de Laspee, the official piper to the Queen Mother at the time of filming.
 There were discussions about having former-President Dwight D. Eisenhower play himself in the film, and he indicated his willingness to participate. However, it was decided that makeup artists couldn't make him appear young enough to play his World War II-era self, so the role went to Henry Grace, a set decorator who had been in the film industry since the mid-1930s. He had no acting experience, but Grace was a dead ringer for the younger Eisenhower (though his voice differed, so someone else dubbed his lines).
 In Sainte-Mère-Église, Pvt. John Steele from the 82nd Airborne (played by Red Buttons) has been memorialized by the local population with a dummy hanging from a parachute from the church tower on which he accidentally landed.
 According to the 2001 documentary Cleopatra: The Film That Changed Hollywood, Richard Burton and Roddy McDowall, having not been used for several weeks while filming in Rome, were so bored that they phoned Zanuck begging to do "anything" on The Longest Day. They flew themselves to the location and each filmed their cameos in a day for free.
 The film marked the last film appearance of Sean Connery before he was cast in the role of James Bond. Gert Fröbe (Sgt. Kaffeekanne) and Curd Jürgens (Gen. Günther Blumentritt) later played Bond villains Auric Goldfinger (Goldfinger) and Karl Stromberg (The Spy Who Loved Me), respectively. Connery played Maj. Gen. Roy Urquhart in the 1977 film A Bridge Too Far, which was also based on a book by Cornelius Ryan. Likewise, Wolfgang Preiss played Maj. Gen. Max Pemsel in The Longest Day and Field Marshal Gerd von Rundstedt in A Bridge Too Far.
 Sgt. Kaffeekanne's (Gert Fröbe) name is German for "coffee pot", which he always carries.
 Zanuck hired more than 2,000 active soldiers for the film as extras.
 Henry Fonda and John Wayne would team up again three years later to make In Harm's Way, a movie about the US Navy set after the attack on Pearl Harbor.
 One of the stuntmen on the film was Robert Weinstein (1936–2019), a French Jew who narrowly avoided the death camps. In his seventies, he wrote his memoirs with the help of Stéphanie Krug. Vent printanier was published by L'Harmattan, and was subsequently renamed L'orphelin du Vel' D'Hiv for its second edition. In it, Weinstein recounts the details of his life, including his work on this film.

Filming
 The film was shot at several French locations, including the Île de Ré, Saleccia beach in Saint-Florent, Port-en-Bessin-Huppain (filling in for Ouistreham), Les Studios de Boulogne in Boulogne-Billancourt, and the actual locations of Pegasus Bridge near Bénouville, Sainte-Mère-Église, and Pointe du Hoc.
 During the filming of the landings at Omaha Beach, the extras appearing as American soldiers did not want to jump off the landing craft into the water because they thought it would be too cold. Robert Mitchum, as Gen. Norman Cota, became disgusted with their trepidation and jumped in first, at which point they followed his example.
 The Rupert paradummies used in the film were far more elaborate and lifelike than those actually used in the decoy parachute drop (Operation Titanic), which were simply canvas or burlap sacks filled with sand. The dummies dressed in American jumpsuits were used in filming the Sainte-Mère-Église sequence. In the real operation, six Special Air Service soldiers jumped with the dummies and played recordings of loud battle noises to distract the Germans.
 In the scenes where the paratroopers land, the background noise of frogs croaking was incorrect for northern French frog species and showed that the film probably used an American recording of background night noises.
 Colin Maud lent Kenneth More, who had served as an officer in the Royal Navy during World War II, the actual shillelagh that he carried ashore during the invasion. Similarly, Richard Todd wears the beret that he actually wore on D-Day, although he changed the cap-badge to that of Maj. John Howard's regiment, the Oxfordshire and Buckinghamshire Light Infantry.
 In the film, three Free French Special Air Service paratroopers jump into France before British and American airborne landings. This is accurate. Thirty-six Free French SAS (4 sticks) jumped into Brittany (Plumelec and Duault) on June 5 at 23:30 (Operation Dingson). The first Allied soldiers killed in action were Lt. Den Brotheridge of the 2nd Ox & Bucks Light Infantry as he crossed Pegasus Bridge at 00:22 on June 6, and Corporal Emile Bouétard of the 4th Free French SAS battalion at the same time in Plumelec, Brittany.
 The United States Sixth Fleet extensively supported the filming and made available many amphibious landing ships and craft for scenes filmed in Corsica, though many of the ships were of newer vintage. While the USS Springfield was scrapped in 1980, the USS Little Rock is now a museum ship in Buffalo, New York. 
The film shows the attack by the 2nd Ranger Battalion on the Point de Hoc. The actual landings were slightly further east than shown in the film, owing to strong tides and high seas. When entering the bunker, one soldier says the guns were never installed. This is inaccurate, as the 155mm guns had been in position until a few days before D-Day, but were moved due to heavy bombing. In reality, the guns were discovered hidden a few hours later and destroyed.
 French arms dealer and former flying ace Pierre Laureys restored and provided three Supermarine Spitfire aircraft for the scene of an attack on a German column. Laureys himself flew one of the Spitfire aircraft in the film.
 Gerd Oswald was the uncredited director of the parachute drop scenes into Sainte-Mère-Église, and Darryl F. Zanuck said he himself was the uncredited director of some pick-up interior scenes with American and British characters.
 Elmo Williams was credited as associate producer and coordinator of battle episodes. He later produced the historical World War II film Tora! Tora! Tora! (1970) for Zanuck. It depicted the Japanese surprise attack on Pearl Harbor in 1941, also using the docudrama style.

Release
The film premiered in France on September 25, 1962, in the United States on October 4, and in the United Kingdom on October 23. Funds from the premiers were donated to the Salk Institute for Biological Studies and the International Rescue Committee. Because Fox was suffering due to financial losses incurred during the concurrent production of Cleopatra, the studio wanted The Longest Day to go straight into wide release to reap quick profits, but Zanuck got them to do a proper roadshow theatrical release, threatening to sell distribution rights to Warner Bros. if Fox refused to do so. The Longest Day eventually became the box office hit Fox needed, with $30.5 million in worldwide theatrical rentals on a $7.5 million budget. It was the highest-grossing black-and-white movie at the time. Zanuck's production company (DFZ Productions) received 50% of the profits, and by 1964 had received over $5.8 million.

There were special-release showings of the film in several cities in the United States at which men who had participated in D-Day were invited to see the film with their fellow soldiers. One such screening took place in Cleveland, Ohio, at the Hippodrome Theater.

The scenes in the film featuring German and French characters were shot both with them speaking their native language and with them speaking English. Almost uniquely among British- and American-produced World War II films of the time, the version of the film with foreign languages accompanied by English subtitles was more widely seen during the film's initial release. The all-English version of the film was used more extensively during the film's late 1960s re-release.

When the film was re-released in 1969, it opened at number one at the US box office with a first-week gross of $501,529. In the first four days of its worldwide re-release in 544 theatres, it grossed $2,846,627.

Home media
The film was released in widescreen with stereo surround sound on LaserDisc in 1989. A colorized version of the film was released on VHS in 1994, the 50th anniversary of the D-Day invasion. The original black-and-white version of the film was released on DVD on November 6, 2001. In 2008, 20th Century Fox released the film on Blu-ray.

Reception
The day after the film opened at the Warner Theatre in New York City, Bosley Crowther of The New York Times declared: "The total effect of the picture is that of a huge documentary report, adorned and colored by personal details that are thrilling, amusing, ironic, sad [...] It is hard to think of a picture, aimed and constructed as this one was, doing any more or any better or leaving one feeling any more exposed to the horror of war as this one does". Variety described it as "a solid and stunning war epic" that "emerges as a sort of grand scale semi-fictionalized documentary concerning the overall logistics needed for this incredible invasion".

Richard L. Coe of The Washington Post called the film "a tingling, eye-gripping, fantastic picture" that "must rank as the screen's most massive battle epic", his only criticism being "the lack of perspective in depicting the German belief that the Normandy landings might not have succeeded had Hitler not taken a sleeping pill [...] 'The Longest Day' should have taken infinitely more care to put this German belief, however strongly held, into proper proportion". Brendan Gill of The New Yorker called the film "a tour de force of audio-visual verisimilitude," but confessed that "my emotions were hardly ever engaged, and I ended, rather to my embarrassment, by being bored". He continued: "Mr. Zanuck made it all the harder for me to take this mock-documentary seriously by stuffing it with innumerable celebrated actors, most of whom make such fugitive appearances that the audience finds itself engaged in a distracting game of instant identification".

The Monthly Film Bulletin stated: "The Longest Day is a monument split down the middle by compromise. At its best, what comes across very strongly is the feeling of immense and careful organisation that went into the whole D-Day operation, the sheer crippling weight of noise, the simple fact that a lot of people died, and the sense of personal confusion and dismay of soldiers wandering alone through the countryside [...] But the film is, first and foremost, a spectacle, and therefore it has stars—a multitude of them, often with barely a line to speak, and usually with no real part to play".

On review aggregator website Rotten Tomatoes, the film has an approval rating of 87% based on 23 reviews, with an average score of 7.8/10.

Accolades

References

Notes

Citations

Bibliography

External links

 
 
 
 
 
 

1962 films
1962 war films
American war films
American epic films
American black-and-white films
1960s English-language films
1960s French-language films
1960s German-language films
War epic films
Operation Overlord films
World War II films based on actual events
Films about the French Resistance
Films based on non-fiction books
Films set in 1944
Films shot in Haute-Corse
Films set on beaches
Films whose cinematographer won the Best Cinematography Academy Award
Films that won the Best Visual Effects Academy Award
20th Century Fox films
CinemaScope films
Films directed by Andrew Marton
Films directed by Bernhard Wicki
Films directed by Ken Annakin
Films produced by Darryl F. Zanuck
Films scored by Maurice Jarre
Epic films based on actual events
Seafaring films based on actual events
Cultural depictions of Dwight D. Eisenhower
Cultural depictions of Bernard Montgomery
Cultural depictions of Erwin Rommel
Historical epic films
American World War II films
1960s American films